Kashif Ali may refer to:

 Kashif Ali (cricketer, born 1998), English cricketer
 Kashif Ali (cricketer, born 2002), Pakistani cricketer
 Kashif Ali (singer) (born 1992), Pakistani singer